Sunken Treasures is the third release by Tempest. It is a collection of rare/demo tracks up until that point.

Tracks
Queen of Argyll (Stewart) 
Nottamun Town (Traditional/Tempest) 
Milligan’s Fancy (Sorbye) 
When Tenskwatawa Sings (Longcor) 
Black Jack Davy (Traditional/Tempest) 
The Creel (Traditional/Tempest) (Celtic Society’s Quickstep/The Drunken Piper)  
And Shall Trelawney Die? (Hawker/Longcor) 
Cat in the Corner (Sorbye) 
Heavy Nettles (Traditional/Tempest) (Trip to Neenagh/Jenny Nettles)  
One Last Cold Kiss (Felix Pappalardi/Gail Collins Pappalardi) (Mountain cover)
Baladi (Wullenjohn/Mullen) 
The Barrow Man (Sorbye) 
Winding Road (Sorbye) 
The Parting Glass (Traditional/Tempest) 

Album produced by Tempest with Mike Demmers, Executive Producer: Teri Lee. Assembled by Mike Demmers at Desitrek #Studios, Portland, OR. Mastered by George Horn at Fantasy Records, Berkeley, CA.

Credits
1989 Sessions: (Tracks 1,3,5,8,9,10,12,13) 
These tracks were first available as a self produced cassette titled Celtic Rock.  
Engineered by Paul Carsen. Recorded at Drone Studios, Redwood City, CA. 
Band Members: Lief Sorbye, Rob Wullenjohn, Adolfo Lazo, Mark Showalter.
1990 Sessions: (Track 6) 
The missing track from the Bootleg record! Engineered by Doug Dayson.  
Recorded at the Music Annex, Menlo Park, Ca. 
Band Members: Lief Sorbye, Rob Wullenjohn, Adolfo Lazo, Ian Butler.
1991 Sessions: (Tracks 4,7, 14) 
These songs were recorded for Michael Longcor’s Drunken Angel album.  
Engineered by Mike Demmers. Recorded at Desitrek Studios, Portland, OR. 
Band Members: Lief Sorbye, Rob Wullenjohn, Adolfo Lazo, Ian Butler.
1992 Sessions: (Tracks 2,11) 
Recorded specially for Sunken Treasures - live digital recordings engineered by Mike Demmers. Recorded at **Desitrek Studios, Portland, OR. 
Band Members: Lief Sorbye, Rob Wullenjohn, Adolfo Lazo, Ian Butler, Michael Mullen.
Released by Firebird Arts and Music.

References

1993 albums
Tempest (band) albums